Hogeschool Sint-Lukas Brussel, based in the Schaerbeek municipality of Brussels, Belgium, is an independent flemish art school. It is a predominantly Dutch-speaking institution located on the Paleizenstraat/Rue de Palais, and at another site, within reachable distance of Brussels' North Station.

The Hogeschool provides exclusively art-related university-level higher education, hence the name. It houses around 1,000 students across its academic provision, and can trace its roots back to the first foundation of a Sint-Lukas art school in 1880. The school offers master programmes (four years) across the disciplines of audio-visual arts, graphic and publicity design, photography and fine art and bachelor programmes in interior design and construction. It also organizes Transmedia, a postgraduate programme for art students.

The Hogeschool actively encourages student mobility, and maintains several links with art schools across the continent through the Socrates programme and the Erasmus programme, with language of instruction to exchange students being English in the appropriate circumstances.

It is closely associated with the Sint-Lukas gallery in the city, showcasing contemporary art and its documentation.

Name 
Originally, however, the name "LUCA" was created as an acronym of "Leuven University College of Arts", as a result of the strengthening partnership between LUCA's preceding institutions and the Katholieke Universiteit te Leuven, through the KU Leuven Association and the transfer of the architecture departments to KU Leuven.

See also
 Institut Saint-Luc, the independent French-speaking equivalent in Brussels with the same name

References

External links
 Hogeschool Sint-Lukas Brussel
 More information about higher education in Flanders/Belgium (in English)
 Find an officially recognised programme of this institution in the Higher Education Register

Universities and colleges in Brussels
Culture in Brussels
Art schools in Belgium
Universities and colleges formed by merger in Belgium